Dacian fortress of Bănița is one of the six Dacian Fortresses of the Orăștie Mountains, in Romania. Together with the other Dacian fortresses in the area, it was designated as an UNESCO World Heritage Site in 1999.

Gallery

See also 
 Dacia
 Burebista
 Trajan's Dacian Wars

References

External links 

 Virtual reconstruction of the fortress
 History of research

Banita
Dacian fortresses in Hunedoara County
Tourist attractions in Hunedoara County
Historic monuments in Hunedoara County
Ancient history of Transylvania